Hersiliola is a genus of tree trunk spiders that was first described by Tamerlan Thorell in 1870.

Species
 it contains twelve species:
Hersiliola afghanica Roewer, 1960 – Afghanistan
Hersiliola artemisiae Zamani, Mirshamsi & Marusik, 2017 – Iran
Hersiliola bayrami Danişman, Sancak, Erdek & Coşar, 2012 – Turkey
Hersiliola eltigani El-Hennawy, 2010 – Sudan
Hersiliola esyunini Marusik & Fet, 2009 – Uzbekistan
Hersiliola lindbergi Marusik & Fet, 2009 – Afghanistan
Hersiliola macullulata (Dufour, 1831) (type) – Spain, Algeria, Mali, Israel, Yemen, Iran
Hersiliola simoni (O. Pickard-Cambridge, 1872) – Spain, Northern Africa, Middle East, Iran
Hersiliola sternbergsi Marusik & Fet, 2009 – Turkmenistan, Uzbekistan, Iran
Hersiliola turcica Marusik, Kunt & Yağmur, 2010 – Turkey, Iran
Hersiliola versicolor (Blackwall, 1865) – Cape Verde Is., Canary Is.?
Hersiliola xinjiangensis (Liang & Wang, 1989) – China

References

Araneomorphae genera
Hersiliidae
Spiders of Africa
Spiders of Asia
Taxa named by Tamerlan Thorell